Lanshan port is a large bulk loading and discharging port located in Shandong, China. 
It is situated in the yellow sea midway between Rizhao and Lianyungang, and adjacent to Haizhou bay.

References

Ports and harbours of China